The Italian Catholic Diocese of Lanusei is in Sardinia; before 1986 it was the diocese of Ogliastra. It is a suffragan of the archdiocese of Cagliari.

History

Ogliastra was formerly under the Archbishop of Cagliari. Pope Leo XII, at the petition of King Charles Felix of Sardinia, by a bull of 11 November 1824, erected Ogliastra into a diocese, suffragan of Cagliari, with the Capuchin Serafino Carchero for its first bishop.

Tortoli, the episcopal seat, was in the district of Lanusei. Other bishops were:

Giuseppe Paderi
Emanuele Virgilio, previously Vicar-General of the diocese of Venosa.

Ordinaries
Serafino Matteo Ignazio Marie Carchero (Serafino Carchero), O.F.M. Cap. (20 Dec 1824 – 20 Jan 1834 Confirmed, Bishop of Bisarchio o Bisarcio)
Vincenzo Fois (Vincentius Fois) (19 May 1837 – 3 Aug 1838 Resigned)
Giorgio Manurrita (13 Sep 1838 – 4 Dec 1844 Died)
Michele Todde Valeri, Sch. P. (14 Apr 1848 – 22 Dec 1851 Died)
Paolo Giuseppe Maria Serci Serra (24 Nov 1871 – 25 Sep 1882 Appointed, Archbishop of Oristano)
Antonio Maria Contini (25 Sep 1882 – 16 Jan 1893 Appointed, Bishop of Ampurias e Tempio)
Salvatore Depau-Puddu (12 Jun 1893 – 12 Dec 1899 Died)
Giuseppe Paderi (28 Mar 1900 – 30 Oct 1906 Died)
Emanuele Virgilio (15 Apr 1910 – 27 Jan 1923 Died)
Antonio Tommaso Videmari (2 Mar 1923 – 13 Feb 1925 Resigned)
Giuseppe Miglior (15 Jul 1927 – 6 May 1936 Died)
Lorenzo Basoli (28 Oct 1936 – 4 Jul 1970 Died)
Salvatore Delogu (2 Feb 1974 – 8 Jan 1981 Appointed, Bishop of Valva e Sulmona)
Antioco Piseddu (29 Sep 1981 – 31 Jan 2014 Retired)
Antonio Mura (31 Jan 2014 Appointed – 2 July 2019 Appointed, Bishop of Nuoro )

Bishop Mura was appointed as apostolic administrator after his appointment to Nuoro, Pope Francis appointed him to the see of Lanusei again, in addition to his current role as Bishop of Nuoro (uniting in persona Episcopi the dioceses of Nuoro and Lanusei).

Notes

External links
GCatholic.org page

Lanusei
Religious organizations established in 1824
Lanusei
1824 establishments in Italy
1824 establishments in the Kingdom of Sardinia